Colméia is a municipality located in the Brazilian state of Tocantins. Its population was 8,141 (2020) and its area is 991 km².
"Colméia" translated to English means beehive.

References

Municipalities in Tocantins